Voivode George Ducas (Greek: Γεώργιος Δούκας, Romanian: Gheorghe Duca) (c. 1620 – 31 March 1685) was three times prince of Moldavia (September 1665 – May 1666, November 1668 – 20 August 1672, November 1678 – January 1684) and one time prince of Wallachia (1673 – 29 November 1678).

He was married to Anastasiya Dabizha, the daughter of Eustratie Dabija, and later to Dafina Doamna; George Ducas fathered Constantine Ducas.

First two rules in Moldavia
Gheorghe Duca was of Albanian origin and like many others of his generation who had migrated to the Danubian principalities he rose thanks to his links to other Albanians of high positions. In his youth, another Albanian, Vasile Lupu (voivode of Moldavia) took him to his court where Duca was raised. 

Supported by Dafina Doamna and some of the boyars, he came to the throne in Iaşi after Dabija's death, but was soon ousted after his opponents appealed to the Ottomans, unjustly claiming Duca's rule was corrupt.

He contracted large debts in order to reclaim the throne, which he managed to following Iliaș Alexandru's rule. The policy of increased taxation led to the uprising of Mihalcea Hâncu in October 1671, crushed the next year after Ducas received Ottoman help. But, as Ducas failed to provide supplies needed for the War against the Polish–Lithuanian Commonwealth, with the Sultan Mehmed IV's life placed in peril at the attack of Kamianets-Podilskyi, the Ottomans swiftly replaced him with Ștefan Petriceicu.

Rule in Wallachia
In 1674, through the intervention of the Cantacuzino boyars, he was awarded the throne in Bucharest; soon however, the alliance between the Cantacuzinos and Ducas crumbled, the prince being replaced by Șerban Cantacuzino.

Last rule in Moldavia and rule in Right-bank Ukraine

He was soon back on the Moldavian throne, following Antonie Ruset (Rosetti)'s reign.

George Ducas had plans of extending his rule over right-bank Ukraine, where Ottoman gains had started with the acquisition of Podolia in 1672. His overlord appointed him as hetman over the newly gained regions, in 1680 or 1681, after much bribery strained the Moldavian treasury as much as the request that Ducas had placed on the taxed categories that they contribute to his daughter's dowry.

In 1683, Ducas joined the Ottomans in their march at the Battle of Vienna. Helped by his absence and aware of the complete failure of the Ottoman plans, boyars throughout the land rebelled, following Ștefan Petriceicu's command, and welcomed the invading Poles and Cossacks.

On his way back, Ducas was captured on 25 December 1683 and sent to a prison in Poland, where he died one year later.

Bibliography 

1685 deaths
Rulers of Moldavia
Rulers of Wallachia
People of the Great Turkish War
Rulers of Moldavia and Wallachia
17th-century monarchs in Europe
Romanian people of Albanian descent
Year of birth unknown